Suvorovsky (masculine), Suvorovskaya (feminine), or Suvorovskoye (neuter) is the name of several rural localities in Russia:
Suvorovsky, Chechen Republic, a khutor in Nikolayevskaya Rural Administration of Naursky District of the Chechen Republic
Suvorovsky, Irkutsk Oblast, a settlement in Nizhneilimsky District of Irkutsk Oblast
Suvorovsky, Krasnoyarsk Krai, a settlement in Severo-Yeniseysky District of Krasnoyarsk Krai
Suvorovsky, Orenburg Oblast, a settlement in Suvorovsky Selsoviet of Totsky District of Orenburg Oblast
Suvorovsky, Saratov Oblast, a railway crossing loop in Krasnoarmeysky District of Saratov Oblast
Suvorovskoye, a selo in Suvorovsky Rural Okrug of Ust-Labinsky District of Krasnodar Krai
Suvorovskaya, Stavropol Krai, a stanitsa in Suvorovsky Selsoviet of Predgorny District of Stavropol Krai
Suvorovskaya, Volgograd Oblast, a stanitsa in Nizhnechirsky Selsoviet of Surovikinsky District of Volgograd Oblast
Suvorovskaya, Yaroslavl Oblast, a village in Kryukovsky Rural Okrug of Myshkinsky District of Yaroslavl Oblast